Erisos is a former municipality on the island of Kefalonia, Ionian Islands, Greece. Since the 2019 local government reform it is part of the municipality Sami, of which it is a municipal unit. It is located in the northernmost part of the island and has a land area of 78.114 km². Its population was 1,472 at the 2011 census. The seat of the municipality was in Vasilikades but more known are the two small harbours Fiskardo and Asos. Other towns are Antipáta, Mesovoúnia, and Komitáta.

External links
Official website

References

Populated places in Cephalonia